(Take what is yours and go away), 144, is a church cantata by Johann Sebastian Bach. He composed it in Leipzig for the Sunday Septuagesimae, the third Sunday before Lent, and first performed it on 6 February 1724.

History and words 
Bach wrote the cantata in his first year in Leipzig for Septuagesima, the third Sunday before Lent. The prescribed readings for the Sunday were taken from the First Epistle to the Corinthians, "race for victory", and from the Gospel of Matthew, the parable of the Workers in the Vineyard. The unknown poet derives from the gospel only the thought to be content with one's lot and submit to God's will, "" (contentedness) being a key word. The opening chorus is based on verse 14 of the gospel. The third movement 3 is the first stanza of Samuel Rodigast's hymn "". The closing chorale is the first stanza of Albert, Duke of Prussia's "" (1547).

Bach first performed the cantata on 6 February 1724.

Scoring and structure 
The cantata in six movements is scored for soprano, alto and tenor soloists, a four-part choir (SATB), two oboes, oboe d'amore, two violins, viola, and basso continuo.

 Chorus: 
 Aria (alto): 
 Chorale: 
 Recitative (tenor): 
 Aria (soprano): 
 Chorale:

Music 

Bach composed the extremely short biblical quote of the opening chorus as a motet fugue with the instruments playing colla parte, thus intensifying the attention for the words. The phrase "" (go away) is first presented in the slow motion of the theme, but then as a countersubject repeated twice, four times as fast as before. As John Eliot Gardiner notes: "In 1760 the Berlin music theoretician Friedrich Wilhelm Marpurg singled out the opening of this cantata, admiring the "splendid declamation which the composer has applied to the main section and to a special little play on the words, "gehe hin!"". (Original German: ") Bach repeated the ""-figure sixty times in sixty-eight bars. The first aria has menuet character. In "" (Do not grumble, dear Christian), the grumbling is illustrated by repeated eighths notes in the accompaniment. Movement 3 is the first stanza of the chorale "" which Bach used later that year completely for his chorale cantata BWV 99, and again in the 1730s for BWV 100. The words "" are repeated as a free arioso concluding the following recitative. The soprano aria is accompanied by an oboe d'amore obbligato. Instead of a da capo, the complete text is repeated in a musical variation. The closing chorale is set for four parts.

Recordings 
 Bach Made in Germany Vol. 1 – Cantatas III, Günther Ramin, Thomanerchor, Gewandhausorchester Leipzig, Elisabeth Meinel-Asbahr, Lotte Wolf-Matthäus, Gert Lutze, Eterna 1952
 Die Bach Kantate Vol. 25, Helmuth Rilling, Gächinger Kantorei, Bach-Collegium Stuttgart, Arleen Augér, Helen Watts, Adalbert Kraus, Hänssler 1978
 J. S. Bach: Das Kantatenwerk – Sacred Cantatas Vol. 8, Gustav Leonhardt, Knabenchor Hannover, Collegium Vocale Gent, Leonhardt Consort, soloist of the Knabenchor Hannover, Paul Esswood, Kurt Equiluz, Teldec 1984
 J. S. Bach: Complete Cantatas Vol. 7, Ton Koopman, Amsterdam Baroque Orchestra & Choir, Lisa Larsson, Bogna Bartosz, Gerd Türk, Antoine Marchand 1997
 J. S. Bach: Complete Cantatas Vol. 9, Pieter Jan Leusink, Holland Boys Choir, Netherlands Bach Collegium, Ruth Holton, Sytse Buwalda, Knut Schoch, Brilliant Classics 1999
 Bach Cantatas Vol. 20: Naarden / Southwell, John Eliot Gardiner, Monteverdi Choir, English Baroque Soloists, Miah Persson, Wilke te Brummelstroete, James Oxley, Soli Deo Gloria 2000
 J. S. Bach: Cantatas Vol. 17 – Cantatas from Leipzig 1724, Masaaki Suzuki, Bach Collegium Japan, Yukari Nonoshita, Robin Blaze, Gerd Türk, BIS 2001

References

Sources 
 
 Nimm, was dein ist, und gehe hin BWV 144; BC A 41 / Sacred cantata (Septuagesima) Bach Digital
 Cantata BWV 144 Nimm, was dein ist, und gehe hin: history, scoring, sources for text and music, translations to various languages, discography, discussion, Bach Cantatas Website
 BWV 144 Nimm, was dein ist, und gehe hin: English translation, University of Vermont
 BWV 144 Nimm, was dein ist, und gehe hin: text, scoring, University of Alberta
 Chapter 41 BWV 144 Nimm, was dein ist, und gehe hin: a listener and student guide by Julian Mincham 2010
 Luke Dahn: BWV 144.3, BWV 144.6 bach-chorales.com

External links 
 Nimm, was dein ist, und gehe hin, BWV 144: performance by the Netherlands Bach Society (video and background information)

Church cantatas by Johann Sebastian Bach
1724 compositions